Štadión pod Zoborom is a multi-use stadium in Nitra, Slovakia.  It is used mostly for football matches and is the home ground of FC Nitra. The capacity is 7.480. Since 2023, it also serves as the home ground for American football team .

Reconstruction
In 2018, the reconstruction of the stadium began. The estimated cost is €7.9 million. Slovak government provided €2.4 million of the cost. City of Nitra provided €5.5 million

International matches
Štadión pod Zoborom has hosted two friendly match of the Slovakia national football team.

References

External links
Stadium Database Article

Stadium
Football venues in Slovakia
Buildings and structures in Nitra
Sports venues completed in 1909